Betsi Gabriela Rivas Arteaga (born , San Carlos, Cojedes, Venezuela) is a weightlifter from Venezuela. She won the silver medal at the 2007 Pan American Games for her native South American country in the – 48 kg weight division. Her first name is sometimes also spelled as Betsy.

She won the gold medal in clean and jerk and bronze in snatch during the 2014 Pan American Sports Festival.

She also competed at the 2012 Summer Olympics.

References

External links
 iwf.net

1986 births
Living people
Venezuelan female weightlifters
Weightlifters at the 2007 Pan American Games
Weightlifters at the 2011 Pan American Games
Weightlifters at the 2012 Summer Olympics
Olympic weightlifters of Venezuela
People from Cojedes (state)
Pan American Games silver medalists for Venezuela
Female powerlifters
Pan American Games medalists in weightlifting
Central American and Caribbean Games bronze medalists for Venezuela
Competitors at the 2006 Central American and Caribbean Games
Weightlifters at the 2015 Pan American Games
South American Games gold medalists for Venezuela
South American Games medalists in weightlifting
Competitors at the 2010 South American Games
Central American and Caribbean Games medalists in weightlifting
Medalists at the 2007 Pan American Games
Medalists at the 2011 Pan American Games
21st-century Venezuelan women